Paul Graham Walker (born 3 April 1949 in Bradford) is a former professional footballer, who played for Wolverhampton Wanderers, Watford, Swindon Town, Peterborough United, Barnsley and Huddersfield Town. In the summer of 1976, he played abroad in Canada's National Soccer League with Ottawa Tigers.

References

Sources 

1949 births
Living people
English footballers
Association football defenders
Wolverhampton Wanderers F.C. players
Watford F.C. players
Swindon Town F.C. players
Peterborough United F.C. players
Barnsley F.C. players
Huddersfield Town A.F.C. players
English Football League players
Footballers from Bradford
Canadian National Soccer League players